Gustave Adolph Strebel (November 11, 1875 – November 27, 1945) was president of the New York State Congress of Industrial Organizations. He was the Socialist Party of America candidate for Governor of New York in the New York state election of 1914.

Biography
He was born on November 11, 1875 in Syracuse, New York. He was the Socialist Party of America candidate for Governor of New York in the New York state election of 1914. He died on November 27, 1945 at St. Joseph's Hospital in Syracuse, New York.

References

1875 births
1945 deaths
Socialist Party of America politicians from New York (state)
Politicians from Syracuse, New York
Congress of Industrial Organizations people
Trade unionists from New York (state)